Antony Kirby Speller (12 June 1929 – 15 February 2013) was a British Conservative politician. Speller was born in Exeter on 12 June 1929, the son of Captain John Speller, director of posts and telegraphs for India, who later returned to take over the city's Bystock Hotel. He was educated at Exeter School, before graduating in Economics from the University of London and in Social Studies from Exeter University.

On his second attempt, in the 1979 general election, he defeated former Liberal leader Jeremy Thorpe to become MP for North Devon, which effectively ended Thorpe's political career.  Speller held the seat until 1992 when he lost to the Liberal Democrat Nick Harvey.

Speller married first, in 1950, Margaret Lloyd-Jones; they had two sons and a daughter before divorcing in 1958. In 1960, he married Maureen McLellan, with whom he had a son and a daughter.

Sources 

Times Guide to the House of Commons, 1992

External links 
 

2013 deaths
1929 births
Conservative Party (UK) MPs for English constituencies
Politicians from Exeter
Alumni of the University of London
Alumni of the University of Exeter
UK MPs 1979–1983
UK MPs 1983–1987
UK MPs 1987–1992